Exchange Square tram stop is a stop in the City Zone of Greater Manchester's Metrolink light rail system, in Exchange Square opposite the Manchester Arndale shopping centre in Manchester city centre. It is part of the Second City Crossing (2CC).

Construction began in 2014 and the line to the stop was tested in November 2015. The stop opened as a north-facing terminus on 6 December 2015 with trams running to Rochdale, until the full Second City Crossing was completed in early 2017. Once the Second City Crossing opened in February 2017, services extended to East Didsbury.

Services

Peak
12 minute service to Rochdale
12 minute service to Shaw and Crompton
6 minute service to East Didsbury

Offpeak
12 minute service to Rochdale
12 minute service to East Didsbury

Gallery

References

External links

Metrolink stop information
Failsworth area map

Tram stops in Manchester
2015 establishments in England
Railway stations in Great Britain opened in the 21st century